Branson West Airport, also known as Branson West Municipal Airport,  is a city-owned, public-use airport located two nautical miles (3.7 km) west of the central business district of the City of Branson West, in Stone County, Missouri, United States. The airport is also known as Emerson Field, named for Robert Emerson, an aviator who relinquished the air rights of his nearby airfield so the Branson West airport could operate safely and obtain a federal grant.

Funded via a federal grant of $16 million, Branson West is a general aviation airport designed for private and charter aircraft. The airport was built on  donated by the Conco Companies of Springfield, with an additional  acquired by the city for runway protection zones.  Another  donated by Kay Renfro will be used for future development, and  donated by city treasurer Martin Eastwood will serve as a conservation buffer zone.

Facilities 
Branson West Airport resides at an elevation of 1,348 feet (411 m) above mean sea level. It has one runway designated 3/21 with a concrete surface measuring 5,000 by 75 feet (1,524 x 23 m). The runway officially opened in December 2009 with the landing of nine aircraft. The next phase of construction will include a terminal, hangars, maintenance and fuel facilities.

See also 
 M. Graham Clark Downtown Airport

References

External links 
 

Airports in Missouri
Buildings and structures in Stone County, Missouri